The Sunzhensky otdel was a Cossack district (otdel) of the Terek oblast of the Caucasus Viceroyalty of the Russian Empire. The area of the Sunzhensky otdel makes up part of the North Caucasian Federal District of Russia. The Sunzhensky otdel was eponymously named for its administrative center, Sunzhenskaya (present-day Sunzha).

Administrative divisions 
The subcounties (uchastoks) of the Sunzhensky otdel were as follows:

Demographics

Russian Empire Census 
The majority of the population indicated Ingush to be their mother tongue, with significant Russian and Kabardian speaking minorities.

Kavkazskiy kalendar 

Notes

References

Bibliography 

Otdels of Terek Oblast